Longjia can refer to:
Longjia language
Longjia people
Longjia railway station